Preminado is an album by pianist Barry Harris recorded in late 1960 and early 1961 and released on the Riverside label.

Reception

AllMusic awarded the album 4 stars with its review by Scott Yanow stating, "this fine set has many strong moments".

Track listing 
All compositions by Barry Harris except as indicated
 "My Heart Stood Still" (Richard Rodgers, Lorenz Hart) – 6:33  
 "Preminado" – 5:29  
 "I Should Care" (Axel Stordahl, Paul Weston, Sammy Cahn) – 3:37  
 "There's No One But You" (Austen Croom-Johnson, Redd Evans) – 4:08  
 "One Down" – 4:40  
 "It's the Talk of the Town" (Jerry Livingston, Al J. Neiburg, Marty Symes) – 5:05  
 "Play, Carol, Play" – 4:15  
 "What Is This Thing Called Love?" (Cole Porter) – 4:04

Personnel 
Barry Harris – piano
Joe Benjamin – bass (tracks 1, 2 & 4–8)
Elvin Jones – drums (tracks 1, 2 & 4–8)

References 

Barry Harris albums
1961 albums
Riverside Records albums
Albums produced by Orrin Keepnews